Merton London Borough Council is the local authority for the London Borough of Merton in Greater London, England. It is one of the 32 councils that form Greater London.

History

The London Government Act 1963 established 32 new London borough councils, of which Merton was one, reducing the number of local authorities in the region. In the Act, the new London Borough of Merton was to replace the Municipal Borough of Mitcham, the Municipal Borough of Wimbledon and the Merton and Morden Urban District, all formerly within Surrey.

The first council elections took place in 1964, a year before formally coming into its powers and prior to the creation of the London Borough of Merton on 1 April 1965.

The London Government Act 1963 envisaged that Merton, as a London local authority, would share power with the Greater London Council (GLC). The split of powers and functions meant that the GLC was responsible for "wide area" services such as fire, ambulance, flood prevention, and refuse disposal; with the local authorities responsible for "personal" services such as social care, libraries, cemeteries and refuse collection. This arrangement lasted until the abolition of the GLC in 1986, when London Borough Councils gained responsibility for some services that had been provided by the GLC, such as waste disposal. Since 2000, the Greater London Authority has taken some responsibility for highways and planning control from the council, but within the English local government system the council remains a "most purpose" authority in terms of the available range of powers and functions.

Powers and functions
The local authority derives its powers and functions from the London Government Act 1963 and subsequent legislation, and has the powers and functions of a London borough council. It sets council tax and as a billing authority also collects precepts for Greater London Authority functions and business rates. It sets planning policies which complement Greater London Authority and national policies, and decides on almost all planning applications accordingly.  It is a local education authority  and is also responsible for council housing, social services, libraries, waste collection and disposal, traffic, and most roads and environmental health.

Political background of the council

Merton is divided into 20 wards, seventeen of which elect three councillors, with the remaining three electing two councillors each. The political voting patterns in Merton broadly follow the geographical divide between Merton's two UK Parliament constituencies.

The eastern Mitcham and Morden constituency, which is held by Labour MP Siobhain McDonagh, contains ten wards and has only elected Labour councillors since 2014, with the exception of a single Conservative councillor elected in Lower Morden in 2022.

The western Wimbledon constituency, which is held by Conservative MP Stephen Hammond, contains ten wards with 27 councillors, 17 of which are currently Liberal Democrats. Since 1990, the ward of Merton Park has only ever returned councillors for Merton Park Ward Residents Association. The most recent elections in 2022 saw the Liberal Democrats replace the Conservatives as the main opposition on Merton Council, winning 17 seats across the Wimbledon wards. They won all council seats in four of the wards, while another four wards were split between the Liberal Democrats and either the Conservatives or Labour. The only ward completely held by the Conservatives is Village, while Labour maintains only a single councillor in each of the Abbey and Wandle wards.

For historic political control and leadership of the council, see Merton London Borough Council elections.

Mayors
At the Annual Council Meeting, a mayor is elected to serve for a year. At the same time, the Council elects a deputy mayor. Since 1978, each Mayor must also be an elected councillor.

The Mayor also acts as the ceremonial and civic head of the borough during his/her year of office and the post is non-political. Each year the Mayor also chooses two charities which will benefit from a series of fundraising events throughout the mayoral year.

The following have served as Mayor since the formation of the Borough in 1965 and reflects their status on the council at the time they were elected as Mayor:

References

Local authorities in London
London borough councils
Politics of the London Borough of Merton
Leader and cabinet executives
Local education authorities in England
Billing authorities in England
London-related lists